Tinca may refer to several places in Bihor County, Romania:

Tinca, a commune
Husasău de Tinca, a commune
Suplacu de Tinca, a village in Căpâlna Commune

and to:

Tinca River
Tench